Miraclathurella is a genus of sea snails, marine gastropod mollusks in the family Pseudomelatomidae.

Species
Species within the genus Miraclathurella include:
 † Miraclathurella amica (Pilsbry & Johnson, 1917) 
 Miraclathurella bicanalifera (Sowerby I, 1834)
 † Miraclathurella darwini (Philippi, 1887) 
 † Miraclathurella entemma Woodring, 1928
 † Miraclathurella eucharis Woodring, 1970 
 † Miraclathurella gracilis (Gabb, 1866)  
 Miraclathurella herminea (Bartsch, 1934)
 Miraclathurella mendozana Shasky, 1971
 † Miraclathurella vittata Woodring, 1928  
Species brought into synonymy
 Miraclathurella acapulcanum Pilsbry & Lowe, 1932 : synonym of Miraclathurella bicanalifera (G.B. Sowerby I, 1834)
 Miraclathurella aguadillana (Dall & Stimpson, 1901): synonym of Lioglyphostoma aguadillanum (Dall & Stimpson, 1901)
 Miraclathurella clendenini García, 2008: synonym of Darrylia clendenini (García, 2008) (original combination)
 Miraclathurella gracillima Carpenter, 1856:synonym of Miraclathurella bicanalifera (G.B. Sowerby I, 1834)
 Miraclathurella kleinrosa (Nowell-Usticke, 1969): synonym of Darrylia kleinrosa (Nowell-Usticke, 1969)
 Miraclathurella nitida Sowerby I, 1834:synonym of Miraclathurella bicanalifera (G.B. Sowerby I, 1834)
 Miraclathurella peggywilliamsae Fallon, 2010: synonym of Darrylia peggywilliamsae (Fallon, 2010) (original combination)
 Miraclathurella variculosa Sowerby I, 1834 :synonym of Miraclathurella bicanalifera (G.B. Sowerby I, 1834)

References

 W. P. Woodring. 1928. Miocene Molluscs from Bowden, Jamaica. Part 2: Gastropods and discussion of results. Contributions to the Geology and Palaeontology of the West Indies

External links
 Fallon, Phillip J , Descriptions and illustrations of some new and poorly known turrids of the tropical northwestern Atlantic. Part 1. Genera Buchema Corea, 1934 and Miraclathurella Woodring, 1928 (Gastropoda: Turridae: Crassispirinae); Nautilus 124, 2010
 
 Bouchet, P.; Kantor, Y. I.; Sysoev, A.; Puillandre, N. (2011). A new operational classification of the Conoidea (Gastropoda). Journal of Molluscan Studies. 77(3): 273-308
 Worldwide Mollusc Species Data Base: Pseudomelatomidae

 
Pseudomelatomidae
Gastropod genera